Jamael Benjamin Cox (born April 27, 1992) is an American soccer player. He also plays for the Tacoma Stars in the Major Arena Soccer League alongside his older brother Raphael.

Career

Youth
Cox spent one season with the Seattle Sounders FC Academy.

After trialing in Scotland with Rangers and in Germany with 1. FC Nürnberg, Cox joined USL PDL club Seattle Sounders FC U-23 for the 2012 season.  He made 14 appearances for the club and tallied two goals and two assists and helped guide the team to a Northwest Division title and a Western Conference title before eventually losing in the USL PDL semifinals to Forest City London.

Professional
On June 4, 2013, Cox signed his first professional contract as he joined NASL club Tampa Bay Rowdies on a two-year deal, reuniting him with his older brother Raphael.  He made his professional debut on October 5, 2013 in a 2–1 defeat to the Fort Lauderdale Strikers.

Cox played for FC Tucson in the inaugural USL League One season in 2019, scoring 3 goals in 23 appearances.

On December 21, 2019, Forward Madison FC announced it had signed Cox.

On June 7, 2016, Cox scored the lone goal in a 40-minute scrimmage between the Burlingame Dragons and the Argentina national football team.

Honors

Seattle Sounders FC U-23
 USL PDL Northwest Division Champions (1): 2012
 USL PDL Western Conference Champions (1): 2012

References

External links
Tampa Bay Rowdies bio
USSF Development Academy bio

1992 births
Living people
American soccer players
Seattle Sounders FC U-23 players
FC Tucson players
Tampa Bay Rowdies players
Burlingame Dragons FC players
Association football midfielders
Soccer players from Tacoma, Washington
USL League Two players
North American Soccer League players
Major Arena Soccer League players
Tacoma Stars (2003–) players
USL League One players
Forward Madison FC players